Bjorn Larsen or Bjørn Larsen may refer to 
Bjørn Larsen (1922–2007), Norwegian economist and civil servant
Bjorn Larsen (rower) (born 1979), American rower
Bjørn-Inge Larsen (born 1961), Norwegian physician and civil servant
Claus Bjørn Larsen (born 1963), Danish press photographer 
Niels Bjørn Larsen (1913–2003), Danish ballet dancer, choreographer and balletmester